Bente Kristine Grønli (born 25 March 1956 in Trondheim - died 20 January 1996) was a Norwegian disability athlete who participated in the Paralympic Winter Games once and Paralympic Summer Games three times for Norway. She has won a total of 10 medals in swimming and ice sledge speed racing. She participated in several sports, but it was swimming that was her favorite. Bente worked as a sport science consultant at the Norwegian Handicap Sports Association for 15 years.

Grønli was paralyzed by Poliomyelitis when she was three years old.

Honours
Paralympic Summer Games, 1972
Silver in swimming, 50 m freestyle technique
Silver in swimming, 75 m medley
Bronze in swimming, 50 m back
Paralympic Summer Games, 1976
Gold in swimming, 50 m back
1980 Winter Paralympics
Silver in ice sledge speed racing, 100 m
Silver in ice sledge speed racing, 500 m
Silver in ice sledge speed racing, 800 m
Paralympic Summer Games, 1984
Bronze in swimming, 50 m butterfly
Bronze in swimming, 400 m freestyle technique
Bronze in swimming, 200 m medley

At the Paralympic Winter Games in 1980, she won gold in Class 1 wheelchair dance performance together with Thor E. Kleppe. She also had good results in other international competitions in wheelchair dancing.

References

1956 births
1996 deaths
Sportspeople from Trondheim
Norwegian female backstroke swimmers
Norwegian female butterfly swimmers
Norwegian female freestyle swimmers
Paralympic swimmers of Norway
People with polio
Ice sledge speed racers at the 1980 Winter Paralympics
Swimmers at the 1972 Summer Paralympics
Swimmers at the 1976 Summer Paralympics
Swimmers at the 1980 Summer Paralympics
Swimmers at the 1984 Summer Paralympics
Swimmers at the 1988 Summer Paralympics
Paralympic gold medalists for Norway
Paralympic silver medalists for Norway
Paralympic bronze medalists for Norway
Medalists at the 1972 Summer Paralympics
Medalists at the 1976 Summer Paralympics
Medalists at the 1984 Summer Paralympics
Medalists at the 1980 Winter Paralympics
Paralympic medalists in ice sledge speed racing
Paralympic medalists in swimming
20th-century Norwegian women